Savino Dalla Puppa (2 April 1929 – 8 August 2009) was an Italian rower. He competed in the men's eight event at the 1952 Summer Olympics.

References

External links
 

1929 births
2009 deaths
Italian male rowers
Olympic rowers of Italy
Rowers at the 1952 Summer Olympics
Sportspeople from Venice